Juvenal "Junior" Zarate (born December 24, 1978) is a soccer midfielder who played for the USL Second Division side Wilmington Hammerheads.

Zarate was born in Degollado, Mexico. He moved to Tennessee with his family when he was 17 and he spent several years playing in local recreational soccer leagues.  In 2001, after a trial, he signed with the Wilmington Hammerheads. In 2003, he was a substitute in the Hammerheads' shock victory against the Dallas Burn of the MLS to progress to the quarter-finals of the U.S. Open Cup. Between the 2005 and 2007 seasons, Zarate made 47 appearances and scored 5 goals in the USL Second Division.

References

1978 births
Living people
USL Second Division players
Wilmington Hammerheads FC players
Footballers from Jalisco
Mexican footballers
Association football midfielders